Weda Hamine is a 1990 Sri Lankan ayurvedic teledrama broadcast on Sri Lanka Rupavahini Corporation. This teledrama is directed by Jayantha Chandrasiri and was his first television series. This drama was shot in 1988 and aired in 1990. It tells the story of a young man discovering the story of his father's life and affair. The series stars Rebeka Nirmali as the titular role alongside Kamal Addararachchi, Sriyantha Mendis, and Edward Gunawardhana.

Plot
In 1990, Deemantha is a young dancing teacher. He is diagnosed with lung cancer, shocking his mother, Maya, and adoptive father, Dharmapriya. Deemantha thinks that his late father, Gunendra has died from the same type of cancer. However, Dharmapriya informs him that Gunendra's death was not due to cancer and decides to tell him the story of Gunendra's life.

The story flashes back to 1958 when Gunendra and Dharmapriya were best friends. Gunendra is a rich businessman who is also able to play music. At a party, he is diagnosed with lung cancer. His doctor warns that Gunendra's life expectancy is a mere 3 months. Meanwhile, Dharmapriya learns about an Ayurvedic doctor who offers to cure cancer of an advertisement. The advertisement tells him the man is named Appuhami and can be found in rural village, Thalakiriyagama. Gunendra travels to the doctor who then cures him and advises him to stay away from alcohol. But, after returning, Gunendra continues to drink alcohol, to the dismay of his wife, Maya and Dharmapriya. As a result of this, He is diagnosed with lung cancer again after 2 years.

Gunendra returns to Thalakiriyagama and learns that the doctor had died before 6 months. He is shocked and tries to return but the doctor's daughter, Mangali manages to cure him. Gunendra realizes that he has fallen in love with Mangali and marries her.

After some time, Gunendra returns and lives with Maya who is pregnant now. From Appuhami, Dharmapriya finds out that Mangali is also pregnant with Gunendra's child. He gets angry and informs Gunendra, who later to visits Mangali. Mangali advises him to keep his marriage with Maya. After so much pressure, Gunendra commits suicide at a beach. Then, Dharmapriya takes Maya's responsibility. After that, both Maya and Mangali give birth to boys. Maya names her child Deemantha. The past story ends after that.

The day after hearing the story, a shocked Deemantha visits Thalakiriyagama with his mother and uncle. Mangali is now grown old and lives with her son. She sees Dharmapriya, Maya, and Deemantha and is amazed. Finally, she tells her son that his relatives have come.

Cast
Kamal Addararachchi as Gunendra / Deemantha
Rebeka Nirmali as Mangali aka Wedahamine
Chandani Seneviratne as Maya
Sriyantha Mendis as Dharmapriya
Edward Gunawardhana as Sinhala Doctor
Elan Silvester as Sinhala Doctor's wife
Wasantha Vittachchi as Appuhami
Jackson Anthony as Anthony
Upatissa Balasuriya as Gunasinghe
Mahendra Perera as Violin Player (Cameo)
H. A. Perera as Dharmapriya's officer (Guest)

Songs
The score consists of two songs:

"Duwillen Sadunu Liye" - Pradeepa Dharmadasa
"Sandaken Daharin" - Malani Bulathsinhala

References

Sri Lankan television shows
Sri Lanka Rupavahini Corporation original programming